Jasper Tissen (born 15 September 1992) is a Dutch rower.

He won a medal at the 2019 World Rowing Championships.

References

External links

1992 births
Living people
Dutch male rowers
World Rowing Championships medalists for the Netherlands
Rowers at the 2020 Summer Olympics